The Lindenhof (lit.: courtyard of the lime) is a moraine hill and a public square in the historic center of Zürich, Switzerland. It is the site of the Roman and Carolingian era Kaiserpfalz around which the city has historically grown. The hilltop area—including its prehistoric, Roman, and medieval remains—is listed as a Swiss heritage site of national significance.

Topography 
Lindenhof (its northern part is called Sihlbühl) dominates the Lindenhof quarter in district 1 (Altstadt), the historical center of Zürich's Altstadt. To the North, it ends at Uraniastrasse (City police station) and to the South, it ends near St. Peter church. In the West, the hill is limited by the Bahnhofstrasse, and in the east, it ends at the Limmat and the Schipfe quarter.

Lindenhof sits atop the remains of a glacier. The hill and its public square are part of the Linth Glacier's moraines in the area of Zürich. The now largely flattened Lindenhof (428 m ü. M) rises about 25 meters above the Limmat.

History

Prehistory 

[[File:Zürich - Lindenhof - Grabstein Lucius Aelius Urbicus IMG 1808.JPG|thumb|Lucius Aelius Urbicus''' grave stone (200 AD) found at the upper part of the Pfalzgasse on Lindenhof]] 

At the flat shore of Lake Zurich were Neolithic and Bronze Age (4500 to 850 BC) lakeside settlements, such as Kleiner Hafner and Grosser Hafner (both small former islands west of Sechseläutenplatz, near Bauschänzli at the Stadthausquai, Alpenquai at the Bürkliplatz square and Lindenhof). Lindenhof was largely surrounded by water: until the early medieval area, neighboring Münsterhof (Fraumünster abbey square) was a swampy hollow flooded by the Sihl. Therefore, Lindenhof was an optimal location for early fortified settlements. Middle bronze age (1500 BC) artefacts were found near the Limmat (Schipfe).Website Tiefbauamt der Stadt Zürich: Züri z'Fuess : Lindenhof-Terrasse Archaeologists found remains of a Celtic Oppidum from the 1st century BC (La Tène culture), whose remains were found in archaeological campaigns in the years 1989, 1997, 2004 and 2007 on Lindenhof and Rennweg.Website Fürstensitz Kelten-Info-Bank

 Roman Vicus 

In 15 BC, Augustus's stepsons Drusus and Tiberius integrated the territory on the left side of Lake Zurich into the Roman provinces Raetia and Germania Superior. Several stone buildings from the Roman period were located on and around the hill. It was part of the small vicus Turicum, located on both sides of the Limmat and connected by a Roman bridge located near the present Rathausbrücke. Turicum, Zürich's Roman name and possibly also its Celtic name, is engraved on a 2nd-century tombstone of a little boy. It was found on May 15, 1747, and it refers to the Roman STA(tio) TUR(i)CEN(sis). The tombstone is located in the Swiss National Museum; a copy is integrated in the Lindenhof wall at Pfalzgasse, leading to St. Peter church.

Using the topography, the Roman military built a citadel on top of the hill in the years of the Roman emperor Valentinian I (364–375), to defend migrations from the North by the Alamanni. It was 4500 square meters large, and it was fitted with 10 towers and two meter wide walls.

 Medieval castle and graveyard 
During the middle ages, the hilltop leveled fort became the retaining wall and gave the Lindenhof terrace a form similar to its current form. The remains of the Roman camp were used as the center of the later fortification of the historical center of Zürich. Significant parts of the lime mortar and ancient castle wall were integrated into the town houses around the Lindenhof and in a Kaiserpfalz (broken in 1218), which served as a place of festivities, including the engagement of the German emperor Henry IV with Bertha von Turin on Christmas in 1055. The Roman castle's remains existed until the early medieval age: a Carolingian, later Ottonian Pfalz (1054) was built on its remains. This Kaiserpfalz was a long building with a chapel on the eastern side of the fortified hill; it is last mentioned in 1172, and it was derelict by 1218, when its remains were scavenged for construction of the city walls and stone masonry on private houses.

In 1937, archaeologists found graves of late medieval children and adults that were oriented from the east to the west. In the year 1384, a chapel on the Lindenhof was mentioned, but no remains have been found. It is believed that the chapel was part of the processional axis Wasserkirche, Grossmünster and Fraumünster church processions that ended in 1524 or 1525 (Reformation in Zürich). These religious celebrations at Pentecost honored Zürich's Saints Felix and Regula and Exuperantius.

 Modern public park 

Following the demolition of the former royal residence, the hill—the only public park within the city walls—became an area for public life and relaxation, with dense tree vegetation, stone tables, crossbow stands, and bowling and chess; the latter are still very popular in modern times. According to a chronicle, fifty-two tilias (lime trees) were planted in 1774. Bow and crossbow-shooting was probably one of the most important leisure activities on the Lindenhof. Each Zürich guild had its own stone table, and the costumed guild members met on Sechseläuten for dinner, described by Gottfried Keller in his poem Ein Festzug in Zürich (a procession in Zürich, 1856).

In August 1526, guests from St. Gallen were invited by the city councils and all the Guilds of Zürich for a dinner. The attendees of this dinner included Ulrich Zwingli, the prominent Zürich cleric; Leo Jud; Konrad Pelikan; Friedrich Myconius; and the Kappel abbey's abbot. 

The Hedwig Fountain (1688) was sculpted by Gustav Siber. It depicts the legend of the siege of Zürich in 1292 with a helmeted sculpture of the leader of the Zürich women. Under baroque influence, Lindenhof was converted in 1780 to a strictly geometrical park.

1851, the Masonic lodge Modestia cum Libertate (M.c.L.) bought the Paradies building and converted it into a lodge building with distinctive gables. At this time, coins, stove tiles and other artefacts from the Roman and medieval times were found. 1865, severe storm damage resulted in a redesign: Instead of Lime trees, the park was dominated for some years by chestnut and acacia trees. The redesign was not accepted by the population, and in 1900, Lindenhof Square was given its present appearance.

Today, there are numerous public events and festivals in addition to the historical guild dinner. The Square is also a tourist attraction. Cars are not allowed in the narrow streets to the Lindenhof.

Among the prominent historical visitors are Giacomo Casanova; Johann Wolfgang von Goethe; Johannes von Müller; Herzog Charles Augustus, Grand Duke of Saxe-Weimar-Eisenach; Johann Gottlieb Fichte; Anne Louise Germaine de Staël; Karl Wilhelm Friedrich Schlegel; Johann Ludwig Uhland; Franz Liszt; Richard Wagner and Johannes Brahms.

 Heritage site of national significance 
The hillside area is listed as a Swiss heritage site of national significance, including the remains of its prehistoric Celtic, Gallo-Roman and medieval settlements and buildings.

 References 

 Literature 
 Mauro Baster, Nicola Behrens et al.: Quartierspiegel Lindenhof. Präsidialdepartement der Stadt Zürich, Statistik Stadt Zürich (Hrsg.), Zürich 2006 (PDF; 2.77 MB). 
 Kunsthistorisches Institut (Hrsg.): Grüne Winkel in der City. Zürich 1997 
 Andreas Motschi et al.: Eine Mauer kehrt ins Stadtbild zurück: Untersuchung und Sanierung der Lindenhof-Stützmauer. In: Archäologie und Denkmalpflege. Zürich 2003–2006 
 Walter Baumann: Gang durch Zürich mit Walter Baumann. Band 1: Vom Lindenhof zum Fraumünster. Orell Füssli, Zürich 1987-1993 
 Jürg Schneider, Jürg Hanser: Fenster in die Vergangenheit: Lindenhof, römische Thermen, St. Peter, Wasserkirche, Haus Zum Rech''. In: Zürcher Denkmalpflege. Stadt Zürich, 1985/86

External links 

 Website Zurich city government: Lindenhof 
 Schipfe.ch 

Altstadt (Zürich)
Cultural property of national significance in the canton of Zürich
Fortifications of Zürich
Geography of Zürich
History of Zürich
Limmat
Parks in Zürich
Squares in Zürich
Tourist attractions in Zürich